Thomson was a city in Carlton County, Minnesota, United States, located along the Saint Louis River. The population was 159 at the 2010 census.

On November 5, 2013, a vote to authorize the consolidation of Thomson and nearby Carlton passed with a 95% approval.

Thomson is adjacent to Jay Cooke State Park and is located on the Willard Munger State Trail.

Minnesota Highway 210 and Dalles Avenue are two of the main routes in the community.

Thomson is located seven miles southeast of the city of Cloquet; and 18 miles southwest of the city of Duluth.

History
Thomson was founded in 1870, and named for David Thompson, a Canadian explorer and surveyor. A post office was established at Thomson in 1870, and remained in operation until it was discontinued in 1955.

Geography

Demographics

2010 census
As of the census of 2010, there were 159 people, 73 households, and 48 families living in the city. The racial makeup of the city was 96.9% White, 1.3% Native American, 0.6% Asian, 0.6% from other races, and 0.6% from two or more races.

There were 73 households, of which 21.9% had children under the age of 18 living with them, 60.3% were married couples living together, 1.4% had a female householder with no husband present, 4.1% had a male householder with no wife present, and 34.2% were non-families. 28.8% of all households were made up of individuals, and 8.2% had someone living alone who was 65 years of age or older. The average household size was 2.18 and the average family size was 2.69.

The median age in the city was 48.2 years. 17% of residents were under the age of 18; 4.4% were between the ages of 18 and 24; 23.9% were from 25 to 44; 35.9% were from 45 to 64; and 18.9% were 65 years of age or older. The gender makeup of the city was 48.4% male and 51.6% female.

2000 census
As of the census of 2000, there were 153 people, 64 households, and 44 families living in the city. The racial makeup of the city was 97.39% White, 0.65% Native American, and 1.96% from two or more races. 21.9% were of Irish, 20.2% Finnish, 15.8% Norwegian, 14.0% German, 8.8% Polish and 7.0% Swedish ancestry.

There were 64 households, out of which 25.0% had children under the age of 18 living with them, 62.5% were married couples living together, 6.3% had a female householder with no husband present, and 29.7% were non-families. 26.6% of all households were made up of individuals, and 10.9% had someone living alone who was 65 years of age or older. The average household size was 2.39 and the average family size was 2.89.

In the city, the population was spread out, with 18.3% under the age of 18, 9.2% from 18 to 24, 28.1% from 25 to 44, 31.4% from 45 to 64, and 13.1% who were 65 years of age or older. The median age was 41 years. For every 100 females, there were 109.6 males. For every 100 females age 18 and over, there were 123.2 males.

The median income for a household in the city was $48,438, and the median income for a family was $65,833. Males had a median income of $48,750 versus $31,250 for females. The per capita income for the city was $24,290. About 4.8% of families and 5.7% of the population were below the poverty line, including none of those under the age of eighteen and 22.2% of those 65 or over.

See also
Minnesota Highway 210

References

Cities in Carlton County, Minnesota
Cities in Minnesota
Populated places disestablished in 2013
Former municipalities in Minnesota